The 2010 IPC Swimming World Championships was an international swimming competition, the biggest meet for athletes with a disability since the 2008 Summer Paralympics. It was held in Eindhoven, Netherlands and lasted from 14 to 21 August.

Venue

The Championship was staged at the Pieter van den Hoogenband Swimming Stadium located in the south of Eindhoven. The complex contains three outdoor swimming pools.

Events

Classification

Athletes are allocated a classification for each event based upon their disability to allow fairer competition between athletes of similar ability. The classifications for swimming are:
Visual impairment
S11-S13
Other disability
S1-S10 (Freestyle, backstroke and butterfly)
SB1-SB9 (breaststroke)
SM1-SM10 (individual medley)
Classifications run from S1 (severely disabled) to S10 (minimally disabled) for athletes with physical disabilities, and S11 (totally blind) to S13 (legally blind) for visually impaired athletes. Blind athletes must use blackened goggles.

Medalists

Men

Women

Participating nations
Below is the list of countries which participated in the Championships.

Footnotes
Notes

References

External links
2010 IPC Swimming World Championships, Eindhoven

World Para Swimming Championships
2010 in swimming
2010 in Dutch sport
Sports competitions in Eindhoven
International aquatics competitions hosted by the Netherlands
August 2010 sports events in Europe
21st century in Eindhoven